East Egerton is a prominent peak,  high, rising  east of Mount Egerton in the Churchill Mountains of Antarctica. It was mapped by the New Zealand Geological Survey Antarctic Expedition (1960–61) and named in association with Mount Egerton.

References 

Mountains of Oates Land